Angelo Del Toro (April 16, 1947 – December 30, 1994) was an American lawyer and politician from New York.

Life
He was born on April 16, 1947, in New York City. He attended Brooklyn Technical High School and Manhattan Community College. He graduated B.A. in political science from the City University of New York in 1968; and J.D. from New York Law School in 1972.

He entered politics as a Democrat, and was an aide to City Council President Paul O'Dwyer. Del Toro was a member of the New York State Assembly (129th D.) from 1975 until his death in 1994, sitting in the 181st, 182nd, 183rd, 184th, 185th, 186th, 187th, 188th, 189th and 190th New York State Legislatures. He was Chairman of the Committee on Education from 1991 to 1994.

In 1985, he ran in the Democratic primary for President of the New York City Council, but was defeated by Andrew Stein, coming in fourth among six candidates.

Del Toro had been suffering from kidney disease for more than fifteen years, and suffered two heart attacks in December 1994. On December 30, 1994, he went to his dialysis at Beth Israel Medical Center in Manhattan, and died during the procedure after another heart attack. He never married.

Legacy
The Puerto Rican/Hispanic Youth Leadership Institute is named in honor of Angelo del Toro.  Each year, the Hispanic/Latino brings students from high schools across New York State travel to Albany for a firsthand look at New York State’s legislative process.

References

1947 births
1994 deaths
American politicians of Puerto Rican descent
Hispanic and Latino American state legislators in New York (state)
People from Harlem
Democratic Party members of the New York State Assembly
City University of New York alumni
New York Law School alumni
20th-century American politicians